Donatella Danielli (born 1966) is a professor of mathematics at Arizona State University and is known for her contributions to partial differential equations, calculus of variations and geometric measure theory, with specific emphasis on free boundary problems.

Career 
She received a Laurea cum Laude in Mathematics from the University of Bologna, Italy in 1989.  She completed her doctorate in 1999 at Purdue, under the supervision of Carlos Kenig. Before joining the Purdue University faculty in 2001, she held positions at The Johns Hopkins University and at the Institut Mittag-Leffler in Sweden. She was also a visiting fellow at the Isaac Newton Institute for Mathematical Sciences in 2014. She serves as member-at-large in the Executive Committee of the Association for Women in Mathematics.

Selected awards 
National Science Foundation CAREER Award (2003)
Simons Fellow in Mathematics (2014) 
Fellow of the American Mathematical Society since 2017 "for contributions to partial differential equations and geometric measure theory, and for service to the mathematical community".
Fellow of the Association for Women in Mathematics since 2020 for "her generous and consistent involvement in, and remarkable impact on, a large number of excellent local, national, and international initiatives to support interest and involvement of women in mathematics at all levels; and for remarkable, pioneering contributions positioning her as a role model for more junior mathematicians, particularly women".

Selected publications

Books
 Capogna, Luca, et al. An introduction to the Heisenberg group and the sub-Riemannian isoperimetric problem. Vol. 259. Springer Science & Business Media, 2007.

Papers

References

External links
 Personal home page.
 IMA Presentation on Regularity Results for a Class of Permeability Problems

1966 births
Living people
21st-century women mathematicians
Fellows of the American Mathematical Society
Fellows of the Association for Women in Mathematics
Johns Hopkins University faculty
Purdue University alumni
Purdue University faculty
University of Bologna alumni